The University of Bayreuth (originally called in German Universität Bayreuth) is a public research university founded in 1975 as a campus university situated in Bayreuth, Germany. It is broadly organized into seven undergraduate and graduate faculties, with each faculty defining its own admission standards and academic programs in near autonomy.

The university offers several interdisciplinary courses such as Global Change Ecology, Theatre and Media Studies, and Health Economics. Despite the worsening performance in recent years, the university has been ranked in relatively high positions for a local university. THE ranked in the first 500, QS in 520, and CWUR in 616. It is a member of the Elite Network of Bavaria (Elitenetzwerk Bayern), an educational policy concept of Bavaria for the promotion of gifted pupils and students in the higher education sector.

Organization

Faculties
The University of Bayreuth is divided into seven faculties:

Mathematics, Physics and Computer Science
Biology, Chemistry and Earth Sciences
Law, Business and Economics
Languages and Literature
Cultural Studies
Engineering Science
Life Sciences: Food, Nutrition and Health (Campus Kulmbach)

University Administration Executive Board

The first chancellor was Wolf-Peter Hentschel from 1973 to Oktober 1999, who was already head of the executive office since 1 January 1972. From November 1999 to 2010 Ekkehard Beck served as chancellor, and from 2011 to 2020 Markus Zanner; his successor is Nicole Kaiser.

Facilities
Bayreuth University Library
Language Centre
IT Service Centre
Technical Support Centre
Ökologisch-Botanischer Garten der Universität Bayreuth, the university's botanical garden
Media laboratory
Cafeteria

Library 
The University library is divided into the following locations:
Central Library with integrated Departmental Library of the Social Sciences (GW)
Departmental Library of Law and Economics (RW)
Departmental Library of Biology/Chemistry (NW I)
Departmental Library of Mathematics/Physics/Informatics/Engineering Sciences (NW II)
Departmental Library of Earth Science (GEO)
Departmental Library of Research Institute of Music Theatre, Castle of Thurnau (FIMT)
Additional stack rooms at Geschwister-Scholl-Platz (GSP)

Study programmes
The university has a capacity of approximately 10,000 students; in winter term 2011/12 the number of enrolled peaked at approximately 11,400 students due to the dual Abitur cohorts. Many study programmes use quasi-interdisciplinary approaches, i.e. "Philosophy & Economics", "History & Economics", "International Economy and Development", "Health Economics", "Sports Economics", "Polymer- and Colloidal Chemistry", "Geoecology", "Global Change Ecology" or "Applied Informatics".

Research
Bayreuth International Graduate School of African Studies – BIGSAS
Bayreuth Institute for American Studies – BIFAS
Bavarian Research Institute of Experimental Geochemistry and Geophysics – BGI
Bayreuth Institute of Macromolecular Research – BIMF
Bayreuth Centre for Colloids and Interfaces – BZKG
Research Center for Bio-Macromolecules – bio-mac
Bayreuth Center of Ecology and Environmental Research – BayCEER
Bayreuth Centre for Materials Science and Engineering – BayMAT
Bayreuth Centre for Molecular Biosciences – BZMB
Institute of Music Theatre Research – FIMT
Bayreuth Institute for European Law and Legal Culture
Fraunhofer Project Group Process Innovation

Notable alumni
 Andreas Voßkuhle, President of the Federal Constitutional Court of Germany
 Auma Obama, Half-sister of U.S. President Barack Obama
 Eberhard Bodenschatz, Director of the Max Planck Institute for Dynamics and Self-Organization
 Thomas Hacker, Leader of the FDP in the Bavarian Parliament
 Ulrike Gote, Parliamentary secretary of the Greens in the Bavarian parliament
 Maximilian Müller, German hockey player

Karl-Theodor zu Guttenberg, German Federal Minister of Defence, was awarded a summa cum laude doctorate by the Faculty of Law, Business Administration and Economics in 2007. After extensive plagiarism in zu Guttenberg's dissertation was revealed in February 2011, German media also criticised the University of Bayreuth. A university spokesman denied allegations of bribery and political corruption. The university cancelled the doctorate and Guttenberg was forced to resign.

Notable faculty
 Erdmute Alber (born 1963), Professor (Ethnology)
 Fouad Ibrahim (born 1938) Emeritus, Professor (Geography)
 Gerd Spittler (born 1939) Emeritus, Professor (Ethnology)

Impressions

See also
 Education in Germany
 List of universities in Germany
 Times Higher Education

References

External links

  

 
Bayreuth
Educational institutions established in 1975
1975 establishments in West Germany